Sadaf Siddiqui (born August 27, 1985) is a Pakistani track and field sprint athlete from Lahore who has competed in international sprint races for Pakistan. Siddiqui represented Pakistan at the 2008 Summer Olympics in Beijing where she competed in 100 meter, placing seventh in her heat without advancing to the second round.

Career 
Siddiqui participated in the sprint events: 100 meters and 200 meters.

Nationals

International 
In 2006,at the South Asian Games held in Colombo, Sri Lanka, Sadaf won a bonze medal in the women's 200m race at 12:07. Siddiqui was part of the women's relay team participating in the Colombo South Asian Games along with Saira Fazal, Naseem Hameed and Nadia Nazir.

In 2008, she represented Pakistan at the Summer Olympics in Beijing. Siddiqui was one of the two female competitors in Pakistan’s 37-member contingent for the Olympic games held in Beijing, the other being Kiran Khan in swimming category. Siddiqui competed in the 100 meter sprint and placed seventh in her heat without advancing to the second round. She ran the distance in a time of 12.41 seconds at the Bird's Nest national stadium.

In the Dhaka South Asian Games 2010, Sadaf along with athletes Nadia Nazir, Naseem Hameed and Javeria Hassan was part of the women relay team that won Bronze medal.

Drug Ban 
In 2010, Sadaf Siddiqui, along with many other top athletes failed the doping tests conducted during national trials, prior to the Commonwealth Games conducted in New Delhi. Siddiqui was banned by the Athletics Federation of Pakistan (AFP) for 2 years for the use of steroids.

Siddiqui claimed that the doping test came positive due to a medicine she had taken to combat her fever. She said if she had known earlier about it, she would not have taken the medicine. Siddiqui said that players are not aware of the kind of medicines to not be taken prior to doping test and there should be an awareness campaign to educate players competing at international level. Siddiqui took up to the government and the media to help her in her case to lift the ban. She appealed to the Minister Sports Khyber Pakhtunkhwa Syed Aqil Shah at Olympic Secretariat to remove her ban. According to Siddiqui, she had appealed before the appellate tribunal within the next 14 days of the ban but it was rejected. The athlete said that after two years, her career would finish

Marriage 
Sadaf Siddiqui married journalist and former General Secretary of Rawalpindi Islamabad Sports Journalist Association (RISJA), Afzal Javed in 2011.

The wedding was attended by politicians and many high-end personalities including Interior Minister Rehman Malik, House in the Senate leader Syed Nayar Hussain Bukhari, PM's advisor on law and justice Advocate Farooq Awan, Babar Awan and other notable people.

References

External links

1985 births
Living people
Pakistani female sprinters
Olympic athletes of Pakistan
Athletes (track and field) at the 2008 Summer Olympics
Pakistani women
Olympic female sprinters